The Sawdust Paradise is a lost 1928 American silent drama film directed by Luther Reed and written by Julian Johnson, Louise Long, and George Manker Watters. The film stars Esther Ralston, Reed Howes, Hobart Bosworth, Tom Maguire, George B. French, Alan Roscoe and Mary Alden. The film was released on September 1, 1928, by Paramount Pictures.

Plot
A showgirl in a crooked carnival attraction becomes the enthusiastic aide of an elderly evangelist.

Cast
Esther Ralston as Hallie
Reed Howes as Butch
Hobart Bosworth as Isaiah
Tom Maguire as Danny
George B. French as Tanner (credited as George French)
Alan Roscoe as Ward
Mary Alden as Mother
J. W. Johnston as District Attorney (credited as J.W. Johnston)
Frank Brownlee as Sheriff
Helen Hunt as Organist
Robert Wilber as Undetermined Secondary Role (uncredited)

References

External links

1928 films
1920s English-language films
Silent American drama films
1928 drama films
Films directed by Luther Reed
Paramount Pictures films
American black-and-white films
Lost American films
American silent feature films
1928 comedy films
1920s American films